Glengyle is a distillery founded in 1872 by William Mitchell.

Glengyle may also refer to:

Glengyle, a branch of the clan Gregor

Places
Glengyle, a place at the top of Loch Katrine
Glengyle, Queensland - Australia
Glengyle Airport

Ships

Ships of the British Glen Line
SS Glengyle (1886)
SS Glengyle (1914) - torpedoed by U-38 in January 1916  
SS Glengyle (1915) - formerly Bostonian, acquired by Glen Line and renamed  
HMS Glengyle, a Landing Ship, Infantry (Large) during the Second World War, thereafter entering merchant service as MV Glenglye